Anyone's Game is a Canadian documentary television series, which premiered on CBC Television in January 2021.

The series profiles Athlete Institute, a basketball training program in Dufferin County, Ontario which has developed a reputation as one of the world's foremost producers of Division I and NBA basketball players.

The series was originally announced with the title Orangeville Prep.

The series received a Canadian Screen Award nomination for Best Sports Program or Series at the 10th Canadian Screen Awards in 2022.

References

2020s Canadian sports television series
2020s Canadian documentary television series
2021 Canadian television series debuts
CBC Television original programming
Basketball television series